Abraham Bahachille García (born 8 March 2001) is a Venezuelan footballer who plays as a midfielder.

Club career

Metropolitanos
Bahachille joined Metropolitanos FC at the age of 13. Already in 2017, when he was 16 years old, he was training with the clubs first team.

After having been on the bench for two games in October 2018, he got his official debut for the club on 3 March 2019, when he started on the bench against Zulia FC, before replacing Yonder Silva in the 88th minute. Bahachille played 17 games throughout the season, 11 of them in the Venezuelan Primera División.

After a total of four goals in 63 games, Bahachille left Metropolitanos at the end of 2021, as his contract expired. Subsequently, he was linked with a move to American club Portland Timbers. On 26 January 2022, he was also invited to go on a training camp with the club in Tucson, Arizona, which he did. Here he also played a few games, but he was never offered a contract.

International career
In September & November 2019, Bahachille was called up for the Venezuela U20 squad and once again in February 2020.

In June 2021, Bahachille was summoned to the Venezuela national U20 team as one out of 15 'emergency players' after two positive COVID-19 case in the Venezuelan 2021 Copa América squad, since all the members of the original team had to be isolated.

Personal life
Abraham's family is Basque Venezuelan's.

References

External links
 
 

Footballers from Caracas
People from Caracas
Living people
2001 births
Venezuelan footballers
Association football midfielders
Venezuelan Primera División players
Metropolitanos FC players
21st-century Venezuelan people